Maeva Danois (born 10 March 1993 in Caen) is a French runner competing primarily in the 3000 metres steeplechase. She represented her country at the 2017 World Championships without advancing from the first round. Additionally, she won a silver medal at the 2015 European U23 Championships.

International competitions

Personal bests

Outdoor
1500 metres – 4:18.87 (Ninove 2016)
3000 metres – 9:15.99 (Herouville 2015)
10 kilometres – 35:56 (Paris 2016)
3000 metres steeplechase – 9:40.19 (Oordegem 2016)

Indoor
3000 metres – 9:20.79 (Mondeville 2016)

References

1993 births
Living people
French female middle-distance runners
French female steeplechase runners
World Athletics Championships athletes for France
Sportspeople from Caen
21st-century French women